Rhodostrophia is a genus of moths in the family Geometridae erected by Jacob Hübner in 1823.

Species
Rhodostrophia abcisaria Brandt, 1941
Rhodostrophia acidaria Staudinger, 1892
Rhodostrophia adauctata Staudinger, 1892
Rhodostrophia anjumana Wiltshire, 1967
Rhodostrophia anomala Warren, 1895
Rhodostrophia auctata Staudinger, 1887
Rhodostrophia badiaria (Freyer, 1841)
Rhodostrophia bahara Brandt, 1938
Rhodostrophia bicolor Warren, 1895
Rhodostrophia bisinuata Warren, 1895
Rhodostrophia calabra (Petagna, 1786)
Rhodostrophia cretacearia Rebel, 1916
Rhodostrophia cuprinaria Christoph, 1887
Rhodostrophia dispar Staudinger, 1892
Rhodostrophia ferruginaria (Blanchard, 1852)
Rhodostrophia glaucofusa (Hampson 1907)
Rhodostrophia inconspicua Butler, 1886
Rhodostrophia jacularia (Hübner, 1813)
Rhodostrophia lanceolata Kaila & Viidalepp, 1996
Rhodostrophia olivacea Warren, 1895
Rhodostrophia philolaches (Oberthür, 1891)
Rhodostrophia praecisaria Staudinger, 1892
Rhodostrophia pudorata (Fabricius, 1794)
Rhodostrophia rueckbeili Sheljuzhko, 1955
Rhodostrophia serraginaria Kaila & Viidalepp, 1996
Rhodostrophia sieversi Christoph, 1882
Rhodostrophia staudingeri Erschov, 1874
Rhodostrophia tabidaria Zeller, 1847
Rhodostrophia terrestraria Lederer, 1869
Rhodostrophia vastaria Christoph, 1887
Rhodostrophia vibicaria (Clerck, 1759)
Rhodostrophia xesta Prout, 1924

References

Rhodostrophiini